Interstate 95 (I-95) is a major Interstate Highway that traverses nearly the full extent of the East Coast of the United States  from Florida to Maine. Located in the northeastern part of the state near New York City, the  Western Spur of the New Jersey Turnpike, considered to be Route 95W by the New Jersey Department of Transportation (NJDOT), is also part of I-95.

I-95 enters the state from the Pennsylvania Turnpike on the Delaware River–Turnpike Toll Bridge, following the length of the Pearl Harbor Memorial Turnpike Extension to exit 6 on the New Jersey Turnpike mainline, continuing north along the remainder of the latter road to U.S. Route 46 (US 46), where it continues as the turnpike's I-95 extension to the George Washington Bridge, on which it enters New York. All of I-95 in New Jersey is maintained by the New Jersey Turnpike Authority (NJTA) except for the George Washington Bridge, which is maintained by the Port Authority of New York and New Jersey (PANYNJ).

Until 2018, I-95 had been discontinuous within New Jersey. From Pennsylvania, I-95 entered New Jersey on the Scudder Falls Bridge and ended at US 1 in Lawrence Township, where the freeway then turned south as I-295. From New York, I-95 continued from the George Washington Bridge southward along the New Jersey Turnpike and west along the Pearl Harbor Memorial Turnpike Extension to end at the Pennsylvania state line, where I-276 continued into that state along the Pennsylvania Turnpike. This discontinuity was caused by the 1983 cancelation of the Somerset Freeway, which would have connected the former Trenton segment of I-95 in Hopewell Township northeast to I-287 in Piscataway. From here, I-95 would have followed present-day I-287 to exit 10 on the New Jersey Turnpike in Edison.

In order to fill the gap, the Pennsylvania Turnpike/Interstate 95 Interchange Project saw the construction of an interchange between the Pennsylvania Turnpike and I-95 in Bristol Township, Pennsylvania, with I-95 being rerouted to use the Pennsylvania Turnpike to the Delaware River–Turnpike Toll Bridge. By March 2018, the former I-95 around the north side of Trenton to just across the Scudder Falls Bridge in Pennsylvania became an extension of I-295, with I-295 extended to the interchange by July of the same year. On September 22, 2018, the ramps connecting I-95 and the Pennsylvania Turnpike opened, allowing a direct freeway route from Philadelphia to New York City and finally completing I-95 as a whole.

Route description

Pearl Harbor Memorial Turnpike Extension

I-95 enters New Jersey at the Delaware River–Turnpike Toll Bridge over the Delaware River in Burlington Township, Burlington County, where the road continues west (south) into Pennsylvania as the Pennsylvania Turnpike. From the river, I-95 follows the six-lane Pearl Harbor Memorial Turnpike Extension of the New Jersey Turnpike east into New Jersey. Continuing east through a mix of fields and warehouses into Florence Township, the highway passes over NJ Transit's River Line and has an interchange serving US 130. This interchange has a toll plaza on the ramp to southbound I-95. After this interchange, the road comes to a toll barrier that marks the beginning of the turnpike ticket system northbound and the end of the ticket system southbound. The Pearl Harbor Memorial Turnpike Extension crosses into Mansfield Township and passes under I-295 before merging into the mainline of the New Jersey Turnpike at exit 6.

New Jersey Turnpike mainline

At this point, I-95 continues northeast on the mainline of the New Jersey Turnpike, with 12 lanes featuring six inner lanes exclusively for cars separated from six outer lanes for cars, trucks, and buses. It soon reaches an exit for US 206 in Bordentown Township. Continuing north through mostly rural areas, the road heads into Mercer County and comes to the I-195 interchange in Robbinsville Township. In East Windsor, I-95 comes to the exit for Route 133/Route 33, located to the east of Hightstown. Heading into Middlesex County, development near the highway increases. At this point, an interchange serves Route 32 in Monroe Township. Continuing north into more dense suburban development, I-95 intersects Route 18 in East Brunswick near the city of New Brunswick. After crossing the Raritan River, the New Jersey Turnpike heads northeast to the I-287/Route 440 junction in Edison. In Woodbridge Township, the highway comes to a large interchange accessing both the Garden State Parkway and US 9. From this point, the road enters areas of heavy industry and comes to the County Route 602 (CR 602) exit in Carteret. In Union County, I-95 comes to the I-278 exit on the border of Linden and Elizabeth at the western approach to the Goethals Bridge. In the northern part of Elizabeth, the New Jersey Turnpike comes to Route 81 which provides access to Newark Liberty International Airport before the road runs to the east of the airport. After the airport, I-95 intersects I-78 in Newark, Essex County. At US 1/9 Truck, the New Jersey Turnpike splits into two alignments and enters the New Jersey Meadowlands.

The mainline of I-95 officially follows the Eastern Spur of the New Jersey Turnpike, which has exits to I-280 in Kearny, Hudson County, and the Secaucus Junction train station and Route 3/Route 495 in Secaucus, where it reaches the end of the ticket system. The Western Spur of the New Jersey Turnpike is also signed as I-95 but is officially known as Route 95W. This road has interchanges serving I-280 in Kearny and Route 3 in East Rutherford, Bergen County, the latter connecting to Route 120 and CR 503, serving the Meadowlands Sports Complex. The ticket system on the Western Spur ends at a barrier in Carlstadt, following which the road comes to a northbound exit and southbound exit and entrance for the Meadowlands Sports Complex and the American Dream Meadowlands shopping and entertainment complex. In Ridgefield, the two segments of the New Jersey Turnpike merge again, with the road continuing north into Ridgefield Park.

George Washington Bridge approach
In Ridgefield Park, I-95 continues north as a toll-free highway cosigned with the New Jersey Turnpike and maintained by the NJTA. It has a large interchange serving US 46, part of which was the original northern terminus of the turnpike. From this point, it has the appearance of a local–express lane configuration carrying three local lanes and two express lanes (3–2–2–3) in each direction, but the northbound "express" lane only leads to I-80 west while the northbound local lanes continues as the main trunk of I-95. (On the southbound side, the "express" lanes function as the main trunk of I-95 south while the southbound local lanes lead from I-80 east.) The road runs near suburban neighborhoods before entering Teaneck and intersecting with the eastern terminus of I-80. From here, I-95 turns northeast and splits into an actual local–express lane configuration with a 3–2–2–3 lane count, soon interchanging with CR 56 as it passes northwest of Overpeck County Park. The highway turns east as it skirts the border between Englewood to the north and Leonia to the south. After crossing CSX Transportation's Northern Running Track, the highway enters inhabited areas as it passes over Route 93 and has a northbound exit and southbound entrance serving Broad Avenue. I-95 makes a turn to the southeast into Fort Lee and heads due south to Route 4. At this point, I-95 runs in between the travel lanes of Route 4 as the freeway comes to a large interchange with southbound exits and northbound entrances for Route 4, US 1/9, US 46, and a full interchange with the southern terminus of US 9W, where the New Jersey Turnpike officially ends and the jurisdiction changes from the NJTA to the PANYNJ.

Here, US 1/9/US 46 all join I-95 and the road continues southeast containing four local lanes and four express lanes in each direction, passing numerous highrise buildings. The road has a southbound exit and northbound entrance to Route 67 from the express lanes before coming to the eastbound-only toll plaza for the George Washington Bridge. Past the toll plaza, there is a southbound exit and northbound entrance for the Palisades Interstate Parkway, also from the express lanes. After the Palisades Interstate Parkway, the road crosses the Hudson River on the George Washington Bridge, which has eight lanes total on the upper deck (the express lanes) and six lanes total on the lower deck (the local lanes).

History

What became I-95 and I-295 around the northern part of Trenton was first legislated as part of Route 39, a route that was to run from the Yardley–Wilburtha Bridge around Trenton south to Hammonton. Seven northeastern states from Virginia to Massachusetts including New Jersey proposed a limited-access highway in 1942 called the 7-State Highway; this was never built. The New Jersey State Highway Department proposed Federal Aid Interstate Route 103 in 1956, and it was approved in 1957 by the Bureau of Public Roads (BPR). At that time, the New Jersey Turnpike (mainline and Pennsylvania Extension) and George Washington Bridge had been completed; US 46 connected the north end of the New Jersey Turnpike to the bridge. The BPR approved the planned alignment north of the Trenton area, which would have run generally northeast to exit 9 (Route 18) of the New Jersey Turnpike. From there, it would use the New Jersey Turnpike to its north end (exit 18, US 46) and a proposed freeway north to the planned I-80, then head east to the George Washington Bridge. The road was designated as part of I-95 in 1958.

In the 1960s, the I-95 approach to the George Washington Bridge was completed, connecting to I-80 in Teaneck. The portion of I-95 between the north end of the New Jersey Turnpike and I-80 opened in 1971. Originally maintained by NJDOT, ownership of I-95 north of US 46 in Ridgefield Park was transferred to the NJTA in 1992 in order to balance the state budget, thus incorporating it as an extension of the turnpike.

Routing through Central New Jersey:  Somerset Freeway

The location of I-95 in the Trenton area had not been finalized when the route was first designated. The BPR preferred using the Trenton Freeway (US 1 and Route 174), which was completed to Whitehead Road, but New Jersey and Pennsylvania proposed using the Scudder Falls Bridge and its approach (Route 129), opened in 1961 to Scotch Road, due in part to low design standards of the Trenton Freeway. As a result, I-95 was routed to use the Scudder Falls Bridge approach. The approach to the Scudder Falls Bridge was extended in 1974, northeast to the planned interchange with the new I-95 freeway, and then east to US 1 as I-295.

From the I-95/I-295 loop around Trenton, the free routing of I-95 in New Jersey, was to divert from the loop between the Route 31 and Federal City Road exits in Hopewell Township. Then, the highway was to intersect CR 546 and US 206 before coming to I-287 in Piscataway. (The I-695 designation, along with I-95's alignment in Piscataway, was dropped when I-695's own alignment became the preferred routing for I-95 to a full three-way interchange with I-287 in Franklin Township.)

At this point, the freeway would have continued northeastward through the western parts of Elizabeth and Newark, then terminate at the northern terminus of the New Jersey Turnpike at Ridgefield, but it was instead decided to route I-95 along the New Jersey Turnpike through North Jersey.

The truncated route, known as the Somerset Freeway, was intended to terminate in Piscataway at I-287, and I-95 would have continued east along present day I-287 until it intersected with the New Jersey Turnpike in Edison Township. The I-287 designation would probably have been truncated to begin at the junction with the Somerset Freeway. Both the Somerset Freeway and I-695 were projected to cost $55 million (equivalent to $ in ) in 1967, with the cost increasing to $375 million (equivalent to $ in ) in 1979. At this point, residents in Hopewell Township, Princeton, and Montgomery Township raised opposition out of the fear the Somerset Freeway would bring unwanted development to area farmland. The NJTA joined environmental and community groups in opposing the Somerset Freeway, as it would provide a toll-free alternative to the New Jersey Turnpike. Due to this opposition, New Jersey Governor Brendan Byrne announced in 1980 that the state would not build the Somerset Freeway. The US Congress officially canceled the Somerset Freeway by way of the Surface Transportation Assistance Act of 1982, rerouting I-95 south on the New Jersey Turnpike to exit 6, and onto its Pennsylvania Extension to end at the state line on the Delaware River–Turnpike Toll Bridge, pending the construction of an interchange where the Pennsylvania Turnpike crossed existing I-95 in Pennsylvania. As a result of this cancelation, the federal government gave New Jersey $246 million (equivalent to $ in ) for road projects in the area where the Somerset Freeway was to be built.

In 1995, increasing truck traffic on US 206 and Route 31 motivated officials in Mercer County to have the state reconsider building the Somerset Freeway as a way to alleviate traffic on area roads. This option was ruled out due to a $700-million (equivalent to $ in ) pricetag. Also around this time, I-95 was extended east along I-295 between the site of the Somerset Freeway interchange and US 1 in Lawrence Township.

Filling the I-95 gap

Due to the cancelation of the Somerset Freeway in 1983, a gap existed on I-95 within New Jersey for roughly 35 years. Northbound I-95 ended at US 1 in Lawrence Township where the road became I-295. Meanwhile, southbound I-95 entered New Jersey on the George Washington Bridge and continued along its present-day routing down the New Jersey Turnpike and across the Delaware River–Turnpike Toll Bridge, where the road became I-276 at the Pennsylvania state line. Until this gap was filled, traffic from Pennsylvania was directed along I-95 northbound (to the Scudder Falls Bridge), then on its continuation as I-295 southbound until its interchange at I-195, which leads eastward to the New Jersey Turnpike.

In order to close the gap, an interchange was constructed between I-95 and the Pennsylvania Turnpike in Bristol Township, Pennsylvania. The interchange was first planned in the 1980s after the Somerset Freeway's cancelation. As a result of this project, I-95 was rerouted from its former alignment in Pennsylvania and New Jersey to the easternmost part of the Pennsylvania Turnpike, replacing I-276 between the interchange and the Delaware River. In addition, I-295 was extended from its former northern terminus at US 1 westward (highway north) to the Scudder Falls Bridge and southward (highway west) through Pennsylvania to the new interchange. I-295 was initially chosen to be extended in this manner, but, in 2005, the plans were modified to extend I-195 from its current western terminus at I-295 and then north along I-295 and I-95 (bypassing Trenton) to the Scudder Falls Bridge and the new interchange. On May 20, 2015, the plans were reverted to extend I-295 to the interchange. The multiphased construction began in late 2010, and the approved design calls for Stage 1 to tentatively end in 2020. Groundbreaking for the interchange took place on July 30, 2013, with Pennsylvania Governor Tom Corbett in attendance. In March 2018, I-95 was renumbered to I-295 between US 1 in Lawrence Township, New Jersey, and Taylorsville Road in Lower Makefield Township, Pennsylvania. The redesignation that officially bridged the I-95 gap was made official on September 22, 2018, before the completion of Stage 1.

Exit list

See also

References

External links

I-95, N.J. Turnpike - West Alignment straight line diagram (PDF)
An enlarged view of road jurisdiction at the Fort Lee approaches to the George Washington Bridge
An enlarged view of road jurisdiction at the confluence of 95M, NJ 29 and NJ 175 in Ewing Township
Rose, Joel. "At Last, I-95's Missing Link Hits The Road". NPR, 2010-08-21.
History of the Interstate 95 "Missing Link" of central New Jersey
The Roads of Metro New York - New Jersey Turnpike (I-95)
The Roads of Metro New York - Interstate 95 (Trenton Section)
Speed Limits for New Jersey State Roads: Interstate 95

95
 New Jersey
095
Transportation in Mercer County, New Jersey
Transportation in Middlesex County, New Jersey
Transportation in Essex County, New Jersey
Transportation in Hudson County, New Jersey
95
New Jersey Turnpike